Kultali Assembly constituency is a Legislative Assembly constituency of South 24 Parganas district in the Indian State of West Bengal. It is reserved for Scheduled Castes.

Overview
As per order of the Delimitation Commission in respect of the Delimitation of constituencies in the West Bengal, Kultali Assembly constituency is composed of the following:
 Kultali community development block
 Baishata, Chuprijhara, Monirhat and Nalgora gram panchayats of Jaynagar II community development block

Kultali Assembly constituency is a part of No. 19 Jaynagar (Lok Sabha constituency).

Members of Legislative Assembly

Election Results

Legislative Assembly Election 2021

Legislative Assembly Election 2016

Note- In 2016 election Congress supported the CPI(M) candidate.

Legislative Assembly Election 2011

Legislative Assembly Elections 1977-2006
In 2006, Joy Krishna Halder of SUCI(C) won the Kultali Assembly constituency defeating his nearest rival Ramsankar Halder of CPI(M). Probodh Purkait of SUCI(C) won from 1977 to 2001, defeating Ramsankar Halder of CPI(M) in 2001 and 1996, Ramani Ranjan Das of CPI(M) in 1991, Arabinda Naskar of INC in 1987 and 1982, and Anandi Tanti of Janata Party in 1977.

Legislative Assembly Elections 1967-1972
Arabinda Naskar of INC won in 1972. Probodh Purkait of SUCI(C) won in 1971, 1969 and 1967. The seat did not exist prior to that.

References

Notes

Citations

Assembly constituencies of West Bengal
Politics of South 24 Parganas district